Hail Satin is an album by the Dee Gees, a side project of American rock band Foo Fighters. It was released on July 17, 2021, for Record Store Day. The album consists of five cover versions of songs originally written and recorded by members of the Gibb family (four from the Bee Gees and one Andy Gibb solo record) and five live versions of songs from the Foo Fighters' 2021 album Medicine at Midnight on its B-side. The name "Dee Gees" is a play on both the Bee Gees and Dave Grohl's initials; the album title is a play on satin (a common fabric of the disco era) and the phrase "hail Satan." It is the last album to feature drummer Taylor Hawkins before his death on March 25, 2022.

Background

Foo Fighters previously performed Andy Gibb's 1978 song "Shadow Dancing" during Linda Perry's Rock 'n' Relief livestream and the Bee Gees' "You Should Be Dancing" on Jo Whiley's Sofa Session show on BBC Radio 2. Dave Grohl said about the recording of "You Should Be Dancing": "I have never, ever in my life sung like that, but it was the easiest song I have ever sung in my entire life! I sang the song, and it was like six minutes and I was done. I should have been singing like this for the last 25 years!"

Track listing

Personnel
Foo Fighters
 Dave Grohl – lead vocals, guitar, backing vocals on "Shadow Dancing"
 Taylor Hawkins – drums, lead vocals on "Shadow Dancing"
 Rami Jaffee – keyboards, piano
 Nate Mendel – bass guitar
 Chris Shiflett – guitar
 Pat Smear – guitar

Charts

References

2021 albums
Foo Fighters albums
RCA Records albums
Record Store Day releases
Tribute albums